Abacetus subdepressus is a species of ground beetle in the subfamily Pterostichinae. It was described by Straneo in 1960.

References

subdepressus
Beetles described in 1960